Usufruct is a limited real right (or in rem right) found in civil-law and mixed jurisdictions that unites the two property interests of usus and fructus:
 Usus (use) is the right to use or enjoy a thing possessed, directly and without altering it.
 Fructus (fruit, in a figurative sense) is the right to derive profit from a thing possessed: for instance, by selling crops, leasing immovables or annexed movables, taxing for entry, and so on.

A usufruct is either granted in severalty or held in common ownership, as long as the property is not damaged or destroyed. The third civilian property interest is abusus (literally abuse), the right to alienate the thing possessed, either by consuming or destroying it (e.g., for profit), or by transferring it to someone else (e.g., sale, exchange, gift). Someone enjoying all three rights has full ownership.

Generally, a usufruct is a system in which a person or group of persons uses the real property (often land) of another. The "usufructuary" does not own the property, but does have an interest in it, which is sanctioned or contractually allowed by the owner. Two different systems of usufruct exist: perfect and imperfect. In a perfect usufruct, the usufructuary is entitled the use of the property but cannot substantially change it. For example, an owner of a small business may become ill and grant the right of usufruct to an individual to run their business. The usufructuary thus has the right to operate the business and gain income from it, but does not have the right to, for example, tear down the business and replace it, or to sell it. The imperfect usufruct system gives the usufructuary some ability to modify the property. For example, if a land owner grants a piece of land to a usufructuary for agricultural use, the usufructuary may have the right to not only grow crops on the land but also make improvements that would help in farming, say by building a barn. However this can be disadvantageous to the usufructuary: if a usufructuary makes material improvements  such as a building, or fixtures attached to the building, or other fixed structures  to their usufruct, they do not own the improvements, and any money spent on those improvements would belong to the original owner at the end of the usufruct.

In many usufructuary property systems, such as the traditional ejido system in Mexico, individuals or groups may only acquire the usufruct of the property, not legal ownership. A usufruct is directly equatable to a common-law life estate except that a usufruct can be granted for a term shorter than the holder's lifetime.

History 
Usufruct comes from civil law, under which it is a subordinate real right (ius in re aliena) of limited duration, usually for a person's lifetime. The holder of a usufruct, known as a usufructuary, has the right to use (usus) the property and enjoy its fruits (fructus). In modern terms, fructus more or less corresponds to the profit one may make, as when selling the "fruits" (in both literal and figurative senses) of the land or leasing a house.

Fruits refers to any renewable commodity on the property, including (among others) actual fruits, livestock and even rental payments derived from the property. These may be divided into civil (fructus civiles), industrial (fructus industriales), and natural fruits (fructus naturales), the latter of which, in Roman law, included slaves and livestock.

Under Roman law, usufruct was a type of personal servitude (servitutes personarum), a beneficial right in another's property. The usufructuary never had possession of this property (on the basis that if he possessed at all, he did so through the owner), but he did have an interest in the property itself for a period, either a term of years, or a lifetime. Unlike the owner, the usufructuary did not have a right of alienation (abusus), but he could sell or lease his usufructuary interest. Even though a usufructuary did not have possessory title, he could sue for relief in the form of a modified possessory interdict (prohibiting order).

In some indigenous cultures, usufruct means the land is owned in common by the people, but families and individuals have the right to use certain plots of land. Land is considered village or communal land rather than owned by individual people. While people can take fruits of the land, they may not sell or abuse it in ways that stop future use of the land by the community.

Ancient examples of usufruct are found in the Code of Hammurabi and the Law of Moses. The Law of Moses directed property owners not to harvest the edges of their fields, and reserved the gleanings for the poor.

Thomas Jefferson famously wrote in 1789 that "Earth belongs  in usufruct  to the living." Jefferson's metaphor means that, like a usufructuary, human beings have the right to use the earth for their own benefit and derive profit from it, but only to the extent that their actions do not impoverish the earth's bounty for future generations. It was, in other words, an expression both of rights (of the living) and obligations (of the living to those yet to be born). Jefferson's use of the word "living" is critical here: he meant that the usufructuaries of the world are those who are alive, not deceased past generations. This idea would profoundly influence Jefferson over the course of his life, and would lead to his acknowledgement that the Constitution of the United States would be revised by future generations, and was part of the reason that the Constitution includes a provision for its own amendment.

Local variations

France 
In France usufruct applies in inheritances. Under French law an indefeasible portion known as the forced estate passes to the deceased's surviving spouse and issue (with shares apportioned according to the number of children), with the rest of the estate – the free estate – free to dispose of by will. However, the surviving spouse may elect to distribute the forced estate as is, or convert it into a usufruct, or break up the estate into a distributable portion and a usufruct good for the children's lifetime. If a usufruct is chosen, a value is set for the usufruct interest for inheritance tax purposes and payable by the surviving spouse, on a sliding scale according to his/her age.

The value of furniture and household items is calculated using a standard formula based on the appraised value of the estate's liquid and non-liquid assets, then the usufruct's value to the surviving spouse is subtracted, and finally the remaining balance is divided among the children on the death of the surviving spouse. This simplifies handling household items since the surviving spouse is free to maintain, replace or dispose of them as he/she wishes during his/her lifetime, with the monetary value of the items going to the children. Title to assets does not pass, and the usufruct disappears on death or at the end of a term of years. A usufruct is distinct from a trust or similar settlement. French law breaks with Roman law by construing a usufruct as not a servitude but rather a possessory interest.

United States

Louisiana
Although the United States is for the most part a common law jurisdiction recognizing life estate instead of usufruct, Louisiana is a civil-law jurisdiction, specifically following the French and Spanish models. In Louisiana, usufructs generally are created in a manner similar to other real rights, by gift ("donation"), will ("testament"), or operation of law. Nevertheless, they are typically granted cestui que vie. Unless otherwise provided in a will, a person's share of community property accedes to descendants as bare title holders ("naked owners"); nevertheless, if that person has a living spouse, the latter will receive a usufruct in that portion of the estate until death or remarriage (La. Civil Code art. 890). Under certain other conditions, a usufruct may arise giving rights to that person's parents.

Georgia
While Georgia does not share Louisiana's civil law history, Georgia General Assembly statutorily created usufructs. In Georgia, a usufruct is "rights or privileges usually arising out of landlord and tenant relationships, and with privileges granted to tenants holding less interest in real estate than estate for years". Under Georgia law, if a landowner grants a lease for fewer than five years, the lease agreement is a usufruct, and the landowner retains the estate. Additionally, Georgia courts consider as a usufruct any relationship between a landowner and a lessee where the restrictions are "so pervasive as to be fundamentally inconsistent with the concept of an estate for years", or the landowner retains "dominion and control" over the business operating on the property.

Philippines 
Philippine law relating to usufruct is set forth primarily in Title VI of the Philippine Civil Code.

Thailand 
In Thailand the Commercial and Civil Code is based on the European civil code and recognizes the notion of usufruct at clauses 1417 to 1428. The usufruct can be done for lifetime or a maximum of 30 years according to the law. It needs to be registered at the local land department to have full effect on third parties, on title deed Nor Sor Sam or higher.

Scotland
A liferent, by which a usufruct is known in Scots law, is the right to receive for life the benefits of a property or other asset, without the right to dispose of the property or asset. An individual who enjoys this right is called a liferenter. The owner of a property burdened by a usufruct is called the fiar and right of ownership is known as the fee.

Cuba
Usufruct has been revived as part of the agricultural change associated with Cuba's Special Period. As a legacy of sanctions and a struggling economy, Cuba had accumulated many crumbling buildings that could not be repaired. These were torn down and the empty lots lay idle for years until the food shortages forced Cuban citizens to make use of every piece of land. Initially, this was an ad-hoc process where ordinary Cubans took the initiative to grow their own food in whatever piece of land was available. Tenure but not ownership was formalised with a legal framework using usufruct to give farmers rights on a profit-sharing basis to the products produced from the land, but not ownership rights to the land itself.

Social Ecology
Usufruct is a central concept in social ecology. Murray Bookchin defines usufruct informally as
The freedom of individuals in a community to appropriate resources merely by virtue of the fact that they are using them 

Bookchin contrasts Usufruct with other property relations, saying:
Usufruct, in short, differs qualitatively from the quid pro quo of reciprocity, exchange, and mutual aid — all of which are trapped within history's demeaning account books with their "just" ratios and their "honest" balance sheets.

He pairs the concept of usufruct with complementarity and the irreducible minimum as core to his ethical world view. 
What "civilization" has given us, in spite of itself, is the recognition that the ancient values of usufruct, complementarity, and the irreducible minimum must be extended from the kin group to humanity as a whole.

See also

 Cestui que
 Classical liberalism
 Common ownership
 Dominium
 Dower
 Easement
 Fee simple
 Four Fs (legal)
 Freedom to roam
 Freehold (law)
 Geolibertarianism
 Georgism
 Leasehold
 Minnesota v. Mille Lacs Band of Chippewa Indians
 Mutualism (economic theory)
 Perpetual usufruct
 Profit (real property)
 Right-of-way (railroad)
 Rights of way in England and Wales
 Squatting
 Trover

References

Property law
Civil law (legal system)
Civil law legal terminology
Property law legal terminology